Rancocas Creek  is a tributary of the Delaware River in southwestern New Jersey in the United States. The creek system drains a rural agricultural and forested area on the western edge of the Pinelands north and northeast of Camden and the New Jersey suburbs of Philadelphia.

Overview
Rancocas Creek rises as two main branches in the Pinelands National Reserve. The North Branch rises in northern Burlington County, in Mirror Lake, just south of Fort Dix. It flows west-northwest past Mount Holly.

The South Branch rises in central Burlington County near Chatsworth and flows generally northwest. This bridge had the capability for the center section of the bridge to swivel from the perpendicular to the river to parallel, to allow small boat traffic through. After rehabilitation of the bridge in the 1980s, the powered mechanism was removed due to the near-lack of creek barge traffic and expense of maintenance. The bridge could be opened in case of emergency, but required manual labor to be swiveled open.

Tributaries
North Branch Rancocas Creek
South Branch Rancocas Creek
Southwest Branch Rancocas Creek

Accidents
On April 23, 1853, the engineer of Camden & Amboy's 2 p.m. train out of Philadelphia missed stop signals and ran his train off an open drawspan between modern-day Riverside and Delanco on Rancocas Creek.  There were no fatalities.

See also
 List of New Jersey rivers
 Lists of rail accidents
 Rancocas, New Jersey
 Rancocas Woods, New Jersey

References

Rivers of Burlington County, New Jersey
Tributaries of the Delaware River
Rivers of New Jersey